absorbed dose
 Electromagnetic radiation
 equivalent dose
 hormesis
 Ionizing radiation
 Louis Harold Gray (British physicist)
 rad (unit)
 radar
 radar astronomy
 radar cross section
 radar detector
 radar gun
 radar jamming
 (radar reflector) corner reflector
 radar warning receiver
 (Radarange) microwave oven
 radiance
 (radiant: see) meteor shower
 radiation
 Radiation absorption
 Radiation acne
 Radiation angle
 radiant barrier
 (radiation belt: see) Van Allen radiation belt
 Radiation belt electron
 Radiation belt model
 Radiation Belt Storm Probes
 radiation budget
 Radiation burn
 Radiation cancer
 (radiation contamination) radioactive contamination
 Radiation contingency
 Radiation damage
 Radiation damping
 Radiation-dominated era
 Radiation dose reconstruction
 Radiation dosimeter
 Radiation effect
 radiant energy
 Radiation enteropathy
 (radiation exposure) radioactive contamination
 Radiation flux
 (radiation gauge: see) gauge fixing
 radiation hardening
 (radiant heat) thermal radiation
 radiant heating
 radiant intensity
 radiation hormesis
 radiation impedance
 radiation implosion
 Radiation-induced lung injury
 Radiation Laboratory
 radiation length
 radiation mode
 radiation oncologist
 radiation pattern
 radiation poisoning (radiation sickness)
 radiation pressure
 radiation protection (radiation shield) (radiation shielding)
 radiation resistance
 Radiation Safety Officer
 radiation scattering
 radiation therapist
 radiation therapy (radiotherapy)
 (radiation treatment) radiation therapy
 (radiation units: see) :Category:Units of radiation dose
 (radiation weight factor: see) equivalent dose
 radiation zone
 radiative cooling
 radiative forcing
 radiator
 radio
 (radio amateur: see) amateur radio
 (radio antenna) antenna (radio)
 radio astronomy
 radio beacon
 (radio broadcasting: see) broadcasting
 radio clock
 (radio communications) radio
 radio control
 radio controlled airplane
 radio controlled car
 radio-controlled helicopter
 radio controlled model
 (radio controlled plane) model aircraft (see under Powered models)
 (radio crystal oscillator) crystal oscillator
 (radio detection and ranging) radar
 radio direction finder (RDF)
 radio electronics
 Radio Emergency Associated Communication Teams
 radio equipment
 radio fingerprinting
 radio fix
 radio frequency (RF)
 radio frequency engineering
 radio frequency interference (RFI)
 (radio galaxy: see) active galaxy
 (radio ham: see) amateur radio
 (radio history) history of radio
 radio horizon
 radio identification tag
 radio jamming
 radio masts and towers
 (radio mesh network) wireless mesh network
 radio navigation
 radio noise source
 radio propagation
 (radio pulsar: see) rotation-powered pulsar
 (radio receiver) receiver (radio)
 (radio relay link: see) microwave radio relay
 (radio scanner) scanner (radio)
 radio source
 radio source SHGb02 plus 14a
 (radio spectrum: see) radio frequency
 radio spectrum pollution
 radio star
 radio station
 Radio Technical Commission for Aeronautics (RTCA)
 (radio telegraphy) wireless telegraphy
 (radio telephone) radiotelephone
 radio telescope
 radioteletype (RTTY)
 (radio tower: see) radio masts and towers
 (radio translator) broadcast translator
 (radio transmission) transmission (telecommunications)
 (radio transmitter: see) transmitter
 (radio tube triode: see) vacuum tube (thermionic valve)
 (radio tuner) tuner (radio)
 (radio wave: see) radio frequency (RF)
 radio window
 radio-frequency induction
 (radio-jet X-ray binary: see) microquasar
 (radio-to-radio: see) repeater
 (radioactive boy scout) David Hahn
 (radioactive cloud: see) nuclear fallout
 radioactive contamination (radioactive exposure)
 (radioactive dating) radiometric dating
 radioactive decay
 radioactive decay path
 (radioactive dust: see) nuclear fallout
 (radioactive exposure) radioactive contamination
 Radioactive Incident Monitoring Network (RIMNET) (in the UK)
 (radioactive isotope) radionuclide
 radioactive quackery
 (radioactive radiation: see) radiation
 radioactive tracer
 radioactive waste
 (radioactivity) radioactive decay
 (radioastronomy) radio astronomy
 radiobiology
 (radiocarbon) carbon-14
 radiocarbon dating (radiocarbon test)
 radiocarbon revolution
 radiocarbon year
 radiochemistry
 (radiocommunication: see) radio
 Radiocommunications Agency
 radiocontrast
 radiodensity
 radiodetermination
 radiofax (HF Fax)
 (radiofluorescence) radioluminescence
 (radiofrequency) radio frequency
 radiogenic
 radiographer
 radiohalo
 radioimmunoassay
 (radioiodine) iodine-131
 (radioisotope) radionuclide
 radioisotope thermoelectric generator (RTG)
 radioisotope heater units
 radioisotope rocket
 radioisotopic labelling
 radioligand
 radiolocation
 Radiological and Environmental Sciences Laboratory
 (radiological bomb) radiological weapon
 (radiological dispersal device) dirty bomb
 (Radiological Dispersion Device) radiological weapon
 Radiological Protection Institute of Ireland (RPII)
 Radiological Society of North America
 radiological warfare
 radiological weapon (radiological dispersion device [RDD])
 radiology
 Radiology Information System (RIS)
 (radiolucent: see) radiodensity
 radioluminescence (radiofluorescence)
 radiolyse
 radiometer
 (radiometric: see) radiometry
 radiometric dating
 radiometry
 (radionavigation) radio navigation
 radionuclide
 (radionuclide computed tomography) single-photon emission computed tomography (SPECT)
 (radionuclide test: see) nuclear medicine
 radiodensity
 radiopharmaceutical
 radioresistant
 radiosensitivity
 radiosity
 radiosonde
 (radiostation) radio station
 radiosurgery
 (radiotelegraphy) telegraphy
 radiotelephone
 (radiotelescope) radio telescope
 radioteletype (RTTY)
 (radiotherapy) radiation therapy
 (radiothermal generator) radioisotope thermal generator
 (radiotoxic: see) ionizing radiation
 radium
 Radium, Colorado
 radium chloride
 Radium Girls
 Radium Hot Springs, British Columbia
 radon
 radon difluoride (see same for "radon fluoride")
 relative biological effectiveness (RBE)
 Röntgen (unit) (roentgen) (symbol R)
 röntgen equivalent man (rem)
 sievert (symbol: Sv) (unit of dose equivalent)

See also 
 list of environment topics
 List of radio propagation topics

Physics-related lists
Technology-related lists
rad
.